Homeboy was a Philippine morning talk show hosted by Boy Abunda, which aired on ABS-CBN from January 31, 2005 to June 29, 2007, replacing Morning Star. Homeboy presented a dynamic discussion of real stories through actual interaction between Boy Abunda as host, his celebrity guests and his live studio audience. After two years, Homeboy went off-air on June 29, 2007 to make way for Boy & Kris.

See also
Boy & Kris
List of programs broadcast by ABS-CBN
List of Philippine television shows

External links
Homeboy at Telebisyon.net
Boy Abunda, The King of Talk - Official Website

2005 Philippine television series debuts
2007 Philippine television series endings
ABS-CBN original programming
Philippine television talk shows
Filipino-language television shows